Lake Mishnock is a residential recreational lake in West Greenwich, Kent County, Rhode Island. It lies immediately north of I-95.

References

Lakes of Rhode Island
Bodies of water of Kent County, Rhode Island
West Greenwich, Rhode Island